Sinematek (a spelling of Cinematheque in several languages) can refer to any of the following
Sinematek Indonesia, a film archive in Indonesia
Sinematek Turkey, a film archive in Turkey